Sarah Dagenais-Hakim is a French Canadian actress and singer, born in Montreal, Quebec, best known for her roles as Ilsa Trépanier in Lance et Compte and Nadja Fernandez in Victor Lessard.

Life and career
After training in Jazz Vocal Performance at Concordia University, Sarah Dagenais-Hakim completed a degree in drama at l’École Supérieure de Théâtre de l'Université du Québec à Montréal. As soon as she graduated, she landed a lead role in 30 Vies, and caught the public attention. Then she moved on to Les Beaux Malaises, 19-2, Tu m’aimes-tu?, Trauma and Légitime Dépenses, to name a few. In 2015, Sarah played the journalist Ilsa Trépanier in the final season of Lance et Compte. This part really captured the attention of the media and the public. In 2016, Sarah was starring in Blue Moon and Séquelles. In 2017, she plays the lead role of Nadja Fernandez in the police thriller Victor Lessard.

Sarah is also a proficient singer, as she has been performing professionally for more than a decade. She participated to Les Francofolies de Montréal, the Montréal Cirque Fest, and collaborated many times with The 7 Fingers troupe. She was awarded prizes in prestigious singing contests throughout the province, including Ma Première Place des Arts. In 2010, her participation to the musical Je m'voyais déjà led her to a radio number one hit La Plus Belle Pour Aller Danser, from the musical's album. In 2015, she joined the cast of 50 Shades The Musical Parody, and is touring the province in 2016. Sarah is an all-round performer of soul, R&B, jazz, blues, Motown and Pop. She is the leader of her own band, Sarah D. Hakim Band, alongside top rated musicians in Quebec. She is currently crafting her first album as a singer-songwriter.

Filmography

Short films
 2011: Le Pourquoi du comment ... Solveigh
 2013: Encrages ... Juliette
 2014: Les gars des vues – Pimp ta route ... Cynthia
 2015: Le Truck ... Sophie

Television
 2005: Le cœur a ses raisons
 2007: C.A. ... Amie de Marie-Pierre
 2009: RemYx ... Rosalie
 2011: Toute la vérité ... Mariève
 2012: Trauma ... Naïla
 2012: Légitime Dépense ... Sonia
 2012: Tu m'aimes-tu? ... Jolie Sportive
 2013: 19-2 ... Josée Martel
 2013: Unité 9 ... Patricia
 2013: 30 vies ... Maria Mazzini
 2014: Les Beaux Malaises ... Jeune femme commis
 2015: Lance et Compte ... Ilsa Trépanier
 2016: Blue Moon ... Diane Delcourt
 2016: Séquelles ... Julie
 2017: Victor Lessard ... Nadja Fernandez

Awards and distinctions
 2009: Winner of the Interpreter 1st Prize – Chante en Français Contest
 2010: Winner of Prix Hydro-Québec – Ma Première Place des Arts
 2010: Radio No. 1 Single – La Plus Belle Pour Aller Danser from the musical's album Je m'voyais déjà

References

External links
 
 Sarah Dagenais-Hakim on Vimeo
 Sarah Dagenais-Hakim on iTunes
 Sarah Dagenais-Hakim on UDA
 Sarah Dagenais-Hakim on the site of the Hélène Robitaille Agency
 Sarah Dagenais-Hakim on the site of the Pierre Gravel Agency
 Sarah Dagenais-Hakim on the site of MCCQ

20th-century Canadian actresses
21st-century Canadian actresses
Actresses from Montreal
Canadian television actresses
Canadian women singers
French Quebecers
Living people
Singers from Montreal
Year of birth missing (living people)